Mordella baidensis is a species of beetle in the genus Mordella of the family Mordellidae, which is part of the superfamily Tenebrionoidea. It was discovered in 1891.

References

Beetles described in 1891
baidensis
Taxa named by Thomas Blackburn (entomologist)